Simmons Bank Field is a 16,000-seat multi-purpose stadium in Pine Bluff, Arkansas. Built at a cost of $14 million, it opened in 2000 and is home to the University of Arkansas at Pine Bluff Golden Lions football team. Originally called Golden Lion Stadium, it was renamed Simmons Bank Field after they gave a $2.5 million donation to the university to upgrade the football stadium in 2018.

See also
 List of NCAA Division I FCS football stadiums

References

Arkansas–Pine Bluff Golden Lions football
College football venues
Sports venues in Arkansas
Multi-purpose stadiums in the United States
Buildings and structures in Pine Bluff, Arkansas
American football venues in Arkansas
2000 establishments in Arkansas